Grande Premio Protetora do Turfe is a Grade III left-handed flat race for three-year-old horses and up (3yo+) thoroughbreds in Brazil.

Disputed over (actually) 2,200 meters, every September at Hipodromo do Cristal.

It is a traditional horse race in dirt track in Brazil, raced since 1922.

Race Day

September, 7 (Brazilian Independence Day) or close to.

Results

YEAR - WINNER - (SIRE & DAM) - DISTANCE -  2nd PLACE , 3rd PLACE - TIME (in seconds)

References

Bibliography
 History

External links

 The Race
 Results

Horse races in Brazil